The  Maximum Basketball League (MBL) is a semi-professional men's basketball league which operates in the United States.

History
Established in 2015 by founder Michael A. Wright, the Midwest Basketball League (MBL) was rebranded the Maximum Basketball League following the 2019 season when Wright stepped away.

Eleven teams competed in the inaugural 2016 season. Regular season games began in April 2016 followed by a post-season in August 2016.

After five games the Chicago Clovers were removed from the league. Lincoln Lions, who were playing a limited schedule as a "branding" team, took the place of the Clovers. Northern Indiana Monarchs also were removed after playing seven games although they would return to the league as Indy Show.

New management took command after the 2019 season which was followed by 13 teams leaving MBL. For the 2020 season 34 new teams are scheduled to compete. Only the Indiana Dream and Naptown Pros (formerly the Indy Show) remain from the inaugural season.

Teams

Former teams 
Atlanta Grizzlies (2020)
ArkLaTex Takeover (2020)
Cincinnati Crush (2020)
Charleston Panthers (2020)
Dallas Kings (2018-2020)
Dayton Eagles (2020)
Delta Elite (2020)
Derby City Flash (2020)
DFW Kingsmen (2020)
Fayetteville Flight (2020)
Flower City Monarchs (2020)
Fort Wayne Vision (2017-2020)
Georgia Bombers (2020)
Indiana Dream (2016-2020
Midwest Storm (2020)
Kentucky Enforcers (2020)
Kentucky Rebels (2020)
Milwaukee Wizards (2020)
Naptown Pros (2016-2020)
Nationwide Hoops (2020)
North Minneapolis Eagles (2017-2020)
Oklahoma Tatanka (2020)
Philadelphia Pioneers (2020)
Questlife Warriors (2018-2020)
Rockers International (2020)
Savannah Cavaliers (2020)
Southeast Shooters (2020)
Team NetWork (2020)
Texas Revelation (2018-2020)
 Arlington Dream Chasers (2018-2019)
Bay Area Titans (2018-2019)
Cedar Valley CourtKings (2016-2019)
Central Indiana Crusaders (2016-2019)
Chicago Clovers (2016) - removed from the league after five games
Chicago Fury (2016-2019)
Chicago Knights (2017-2019)
Dallas Kings (2018-2020)
Dayton Air Strikers (2016-2018)
Game Solid (2020)
Hamilton Heroes (2016)
Illinois Bulldogs (2017)
Indiana Fury (2016-2019)
Iowa Elite Pro (2018-2019)
Kentucky Flash (2016-2018)
Lincoln Lions (2016-18)
Milwaukee Wizards (2017) - returned in 2020
Minnesota Arctic Blast (2017)
Minnesota Broncos (2016-2019)
Minnesota Lakers (2016-2019)
Minnesota Pitbulls (2017)
North Minneapolis Eagles (2017-2019) - returned in 2020
Rochester Roadrunners (2017-2019)
Springfield Panthers (2017-2019)
TC Elite (2017-2019)
Wisconsin Game Changers (2017)
Wisconsin/Milwaukee Storm (2016-2017)

Champions

References

External links
 Maximum Basketball League

Basketball leagues in the United States